The 2017 UK Open Qualifiers consisted of 6 darts tournaments on the 2017 PDC Pro Tour, used to determine seedings for the 2017 UK Open.

Prize money
The prize money for the UK Open qualifiers had each event having a prize fund of £60,000.

This is how the prize money is divided:

Reuslts

Qualifier 1
Qualifier 1 was contested on Friday 3 February 2017 at the Robin Park Tennis Centre in Wigan.

Qualifier 2
Qualifier 2 was contested on Saturday 4 February 2017 at the Robin Park Tennis Centre in Wigan.

Qualifier 3
Qualifier 3 was contested on Sunday 5 February 2017 at the Robin Park Tennis Centre in Wigan.  hit a nine-dart finish against .

Qualifier 4
Qualifier 4 was contested on Friday 10 February 2017 at the Robin Park Tennis Centre in Wigan.

Qualifier 5
Qualifier 5 was contested on Saturday 11 February 2017 at the Robin Park Tennis Centre in Wigan.  and  hit nine-dart finishes against  and  respectively.

Qualifier 6
Qualifier 6 was contested on Sunday 12 February 2017 at the Robin Park Tennis Centre in Wigan.

References

2017 in darts
2017 PDC Pro Tour